Miroslav Krištić (born February 14, 1990) is a Croatian footballer, who is currently playing for Croatian lower league club Kamen Ivanbegovina.

Club career

NK Imotski
Krištić started his career with local club NK Imotski, scoring 2 goals in 14 appearances for his club

Balestier Khalsa
Following recommendations from former Singaporean International Mirko Grabovac, Krištić was signed by the Tigers from NK Imotski in the Croatian third division.

He later had a spell at Austrian fourth tier-side SV Würmla.

References

External links
 

1990 births
Living people
Sportspeople from Imotski
Association football forwards
Croatian footballers
NK Imotski players
Balestier Khalsa FC players
HNK Zmaj Makarska players
First Football League (Croatia) players
Singapore Premier League players
Austrian Landesliga players
Second Football League (Croatia) players
Croatian expatriate footballers
Expatriate footballers in Singapore
Croatian expatriate sportspeople in Singapore
Expatriate footballers in Austria
Croatian expatriate sportspeople in Austria